The Web were a British jazz/blues band, with a style simultaneously related to America's West Coast groove and UK's proto-prog movement. Hailing from the British psychedelic scene, their style is often described as atmospheric, moody, melancholy, and dark. They were originally fronted by African-American singer John L. Watson, with whom they released two studio albums, Fully Interlocking (1968) and Theraposa Blondi (1970). The band increasingly delved into a progressive rock sound with which Watson's vocal style was incompatible, so they set Watson up with a solo career and replaced him with keyboardist/vocalist Dave Lawson. Shortening their name to simply Web, the band fully embraced their new jazz-prog sound on their third LP, I Spider (1970). Following the departure of saxophonist/flautist Tom Harris, the band changed names again, to Samurai. A final, self-titled album followed in 1971. With the band losing steam due to financial struggles and lack of recognition, Lawson accepted an invitation to join Greenslade.

Members
John L. Watson - Vocals (1968-'70)
Dave Lawson - Vocals/Keys (1970-'71).
Tom Harris - Woodwind.
John Eaton - Guitar.
Tony Edwards - Guitar.
Dick Lee-Smtih - Bass.
Lennie Wright - Drums/Percussion.
Kenny Beveridge - Drums/Percussion.

Discography

Singles

 "Hatton Mill Morning" / "Conscience" - Deram DM 201 - 1968
 "Baby Won't You Leave Me Alone" / "Mcvernon Street" - Deram DM 217 - 1968 – UK #52
 "Monday to Friday" / "Harold Dubbleyew" Deram DM 253 - 1969

Albums
 Fully Interlocking - Deram SML 1025 - 1968
 Theraphosa Blondi - Deram SML-R 1058 - 1969
 I Spider - Polydor 2383 024 - 1970 (as Web)
 Samurai - Greenwich Grammophone Co. GSLP 1003 - 1971 (as Samurai)

References

External links
 The Web Myspace

British blues musical groups
British jazz ensembles
Deram Records artists